Therese Malten was the stage name of Therese Müller (21 June 1855 – 2 January 1930), a well-known German dramatic soprano.

In 1882, Richard Wagner selected her as the original Kundry in Parsifal. From that time on till her retirement in 1903, she remained a member of the Dresden Opera, with frequent leaves of absence for appearances in the principal European opera houses.

Her repertory included many of the great mainstream operas, but she was pre-eminent as an interpreter of Wagner's heroines.
  
 

1855 births
1930 deaths
People from East Prussia
People from Insterburg
German operatic sopranos
People from the Province of Prussia